The Mountain Lakes Wilderness is a wilderness area located in the Fremont–Winema National Forest in the southern Cascade Range of Oregon in the United States.  It surrounds a cluster of four overlapping shield volcanoes, the highest of which is  Aspen Butte.  Over 20 small lakes lie along the bottoms of several large cirques carved by Ice Age glaciers near the summits of the volcanoes.

The Mountain Lakes Wilderness is unique among United States wilderness areas in that it is the only one whose borders form a square, occupying the  area of a single survey township.

Recreation
Popular recreational activities in the Mountain Lakes Wilderness include hiking, cross-country skiing, camping, and fishing.  Fish species are stocked in lakes every other year. Both brook and rainbow trout are stocked in Harriette, Como, and West Lakes.  Mystic, Paragon, and South Pass Lakes are only stocked with brook trout. This Wilderness can be accessed by 3 different trails. The Trails are Clover Creek, Mountain Lakes, and Varney Creek.

Trails 
 Clover Creek Trail (4 Miles)
 Mountain Lakes Trail (6.5 Miles)
 Varney Creek Trail (4.5 Miles)

See also
 List of Oregon Wildernesses
 List of U.S. Wilderness Areas
 Wilderness Act
 
 USFS

References

External links
 Fremont–Winema National Forest: Mountain Lakes Wilderness (official USFS site) The story of the geological origin of the Mountain Lakes Wilderness presented on the USFS site is not correct; see the reference above (Carver, 1972) for an accurate geological history.
 Mountain Lakes Wilderness, Oregon - GORP
 Mountain Lakes Wilderness Air Resource Management Data

Cascade Range
Wilderness areas of Oregon
Protected areas of Klamath County, Oregon
Fremont–Winema National Forest
1964 establishments in Oregon
Protected areas established in 1964